Sergey Konstantinovich Klevchenya (born January 21, 1971, in Barnaul) is a Russian speed skater who competed for the Unified Team in the 1992 Winter Olympics and for Russia in the 1994 Winter Olympics, in the 1998 Winter Olympics, and in the 2002 Winter Olympics.

In 1992 he competed for the Unified Team and finished 21st in the 500 metres event.

Two years later when competing for Russia he won the silver medal in the 500 metres competition and the bronze medal in the 1000 metres contest.

At the 1998 Games he finished 14th in the 500 metres event and 33rd in the 1000 metres competition.

His final Olympic appearance was in 2002 when he finished ninth in the 1000 metres contest and 13th in the 500 metres event.

External links
 
 
 
 

1971 births
Living people
Sportspeople from Barnaul
Russian male speed skaters
Olympic speed skaters of the Unified Team
Olympic speed skaters of Russia
Olympic silver medalists for Russia
Olympic bronze medalists for Russia
Olympic medalists in speed skating
Speed skaters at the 1992 Winter Olympics
Speed skaters at the 1994 Winter Olympics
Speed skaters at the 1998 Winter Olympics
Speed skaters at the 2002 Winter Olympics
Medalists at the 1994 Winter Olympics
World Sprint Speed Skating Championships medalists